The 1956–57 Eerste Divisie was the first season in the history of the Eerste Divisie, the second tier of football in the Netherlands. The league had been divided in two, with an Eerste Divisie A and an Eerste Divisie B, each comprising 16 teams. The two champions, ADO Den Haag and Blauw-Wit Amsterdam, were promoted to the Eredivisie, while the teams finishing last in each division, Emma and EBOH, both of Dordrecht, were relegated to the Tweede Divisie.

The composition of the league was based on the results of the previous season. The teams that had finished 10th to 18th in the Hoofdklasse A and Hoofdklasse B, then the country's highest tiers, and 14 teams from the Eerste Klasse were placed in the Eerste Divisie.

Eerste Divisie A

Match table

Eerste Divisie B

Match table

See also
 1956–57 Eredivisie
 1956–57 Tweede Divisie

References
 RSSSF

Eerste Divisie seasons
2
Neth